The Fairchild T-46 was an American light jet trainer aircraft of the 1980s. It was cancelled in 1986 with only three aircraft being produced.

Design and development
The United States Air Force (USAF) launched its Next Generation Trainer (NGT) program to replace the Cessna T-37 Tweet primary trainer in 1981. Fairchild-Republic submitted a shoulder-winged monoplane with a twin tail, powered by two Garrett F109 turbofans and with pilot and instructor sitting side by side. Part of the rationale was an expectation of increasing levels of general aviation traffic. A pressurized trainer would permit training at higher altitude, leading to fewer restrictions on the new pilots.

In order to validate the proposed aircraft's design, and to explore its flight handling characteristics, Fairchild Republic contracted with Ames Industries of Bohemia, New York to build a flyable 62% scale version. Burt Rutan's Rutan Aircraft Factory (RAF) in Mojave, California was contracted to perform the flight test evaluations, with test pilot Dick Rutan doing the flying. The scale version was known at RAF as the Model 73 NGT, this flying on 10 September 1981. One requirement was for the aircraft to be able to go into a spin, but to also have easy recovery from the spin. This was demonstrated using the Model 73 NTG.

Fairchild's design, to be designated T-46, was announced winner of the NGT competition on 2 July 1982, with the USAF placing an order for two prototypes and options for 54 production aircraft. It was planned to build 650 T-46s for the USAF by 1991.

The aircraft first flew on 15 October 1985, six months later than originally programmed date of 15 April. Costs had increased significantly during the development process, with the predicted unit cost rising from $1.5 million in 1982 to $3 million in February 1985. The 1985 Gramm–Rudman–Hollings Balanced Budget Act mandated spending cuts for the US government in an attempt to limit the national debt, and while testing did not reveal any major problems, Secretary of the Air Force Russell A. Rourke cancelled procurement of the T-46, while allowing limited development to continue. While attempts were made in Congress to reinstate the program, which resulted in the FY 1987 budget being delayed, an amendment was passed to the 1987 Appropriations Bill to forbid any spending on the T-46 until further evaluation of the T-46 against the T-37 and other trainers took place.

The project was cancelled a little more than a year later, for reasons that largely remain controversial. The T-46 was the last project of the Fairchild Republic Corporation, and after the program termination Fairchild had no more income. Without any new contracts and the NGT program cancelled, the company closed the Republic factory in Farmingdale, New York, bringing 60 years of Fairchild aircraft manufacturing to an end.

The aircraft itself featured a side-by-side configuration, a twin (or "H") tail (similar to the company's A-10), ejection seats, pressurization, and two turbofan engines.  Had it gone into full production the NGT program called for 650 aircraft being built up to 1992. There was potential for some overseas sales as well, such as in the light ground attack role in addition to its role as a trainer.

Operators

United States Air Force

Aircraft on display
All three prototypes have been preserved:
 84-0492 can be seen at the Air Force Flight Test Center Museum at Edwards Air Force Base, California.
 84-0493 is under restoration at the National Museum of the United States Air Force.
 85-1596 can be seen at the AMARG "Celebrity Row" during the AMARG bus tour from the Pima Air Museum, Arizona
 The Model 73 NGT Flight Demonstrator can be seen at the Cradle of Aviation Museum, New York

Specifications (T-46) (performance estimated)

See also

References

Notes

Bibliography

 Braybrook, Roy. "Tweety-Bird Replacement". Air International, June 1985, Vol 28, No. 6. pp. 273–280.
 "Fairchild wins NGT". Flight International, 17 July 1982, p. 122.
 Mormillo, Frank B. "T-46A: The Trainer of the Future?" Aircraft Illustrated, December 1986, Vol. 19, No. 12. pp. 648–653.
 "T-46A is flown". Flight International 26 October 1985, p. 8.
 Taylor, John W. R. (editor) Jane's All the World's Aircraft 1986–87. London: Jane's Yearbooks, 1986. .
 "USAF trainer contest opened to all" Flight International, 8 November 1986, p. 9.
 Warwick, Graham "T-46: A Class Apart". Flight International, 13 April 1985, pp. 24–29.

External links

 Global Security Article on the T-46
 Includes photo of RAF Model 73 flown by Dick Rutan
 Aircraft Procurement: Development and Production Issues Concerning the T-46A Aircraft

T-46
1980s United States military trainer aircraft
Twinjets
Shoulder-wing aircraft
Aircraft first flown in 1985